Dare to Be Different is an album by Australian guitarist Tommy Emmanuel. Released in 1990, the album peaked at number 13 on the ARIA Charts, becoming his first top twenty album. The album was certified gold in Australia in 1992.

At the ARIA Music Awards of 1991, the album was nominated for ARIA Award for Best Adult Contemporary Album but lost to Come in Spinner (album).

Track listing

Charts

Certifications

References

1990 albums
Tommy Emmanuel albums
Mega Records albums